The Fédération des sociétés féminines sportives de France (FSFSF, later the Fédération feminine sportive de France (FFSF)) was a French organisation set up to promote women's sport. The FSFSF was responsible for the French women's football championship from 1919 until 1932, and organised the Women's Olympiad, an alternative to the Olympic Games, between 1921 and 1923.

History
The  (FSFSF) was founded in December 1917. In January 1918, the French Athletics Federation refused to take responsibility for women's sport, and the FSFSF was officially recognised as an organiser of women's sport. Alice Milliat, Pierre Payssé and Albert Pelan, were founding members. Payssé and Pelan were both organisers of existing women's sports organisations. The first president of the FSFSF was surgeon Fauvre de Bouvet, and the FSFSF's initial board contained only two female members: Milliat and Marie Surcouf. In 1919, Milliat became the FSFSF's president, and from that time, the organisation was only run by women. The FSFSF did not class itself as a feminist movement. Milliat resigned as president in 1925, and later became president again from 1930 until 1936. The FSFSF was disbanded in 1936, after Milliat resigned as president of the organisation.

Sports

The FSFSF sought to promote sports that were seen as "unfeminine" at the time. Its sports included athletics, pushball, field hockey, basketball, swimming, rowing, and cross country running.

The first championship in 1919 featured two teams: Fémina Sport and En Avant. They competed in a two-legged tie, which was won on aggregate by Fémina Sport. In 1924, 16 teams competed in the league, which reduced to eight teams in 1931. There was criticism of the effects of playing football on women's health, and a concern that the league was heavily orientated towards Paris, where most teams were based. In total, Fémina Sport won the championship 11 times, En Avant won twice, and  won the title once.

In 1920, a French XI organised by the FSFSF travelled to England to play four football matches against Dick, Kerr Ladies F.C. Dick, Kerr Ladies travelled to France later in the year to play four more matches against a French XI; the match at Stade Pershing in Paris attracted 22,000 supporters. In 1922, an FSFSF team played matches against a British XI in Plymouth and Exeter, United Kingdom and a Cornish XI in Falmouth, Cornwall, United Kingdom.

The FSFSF-organised events ran from 1921 to 1923. They were superseded by the Women's World Games, organised by the International Women's Sports Federation (FSFI); the FSFI and the British Women's Amateur Athletic Association also jointly organised the 1924 Women's Olympiad. The FSFI had been founded at a meeting following the 1921 Women's Olympiad.

References

Women's rights in France
1917 establishments in France
1936 disestablishments in France
Women's organizations based in France
Sport in France